Christianus Franciscus Johannes Boers (24 October 1889 – 3 May 1942) was a captain in the Royal Netherlands Army during World War II who scored one of the few Allied victories during the German invasion of the Netherlands, by rallying his men in holding off and pushing back the German attackers during the Battle of the Afsluitdijk, fought from 12 to 14 May 1940.

The organization was led almost entirely by ex-army officers, but had been infiltrated by a German informant. Subsequently, Boers and other members were arrested over the spring and summer of 1941. After a mass trial, Boers was executed at Sachsenhausen concentration camp in 1942.

Boers is often described as a "professional officer" and a "natural leader" by modern Dutch historiography, being one of only a few successful Dutch military commanders during the German invasion. Boers was posthumously awarded the Bronze Cross on 9 May 1946, for his actions as commander of Fort Kornwerderzand. Close to the Fort, a monument was dedicated to Boers' memory. In June 2005, the Kornwerderzand viaduct was renamed the Captain Boers Viaduct, the sign being unveiled by Boers' son and grandson.

References

External links 
 Boers Monument 
 Battle of the Afsluitdijk Museum 

1889 births
1942 deaths
Dutch military personnel killed in World War II
Dutch people executed in Nazi concentration camps
Dutch resistance members
Military personnel who died in Nazi concentration camps
Military personnel from The Hague
People who died in Sachsenhausen concentration camp
Recipients of the Bronze Cross (Netherlands)
Royal Netherlands Army personnel of World War II
Royal Netherlands Army officers